The Šopka (Шопка) is a Macedonian oro from the region of Kratovo.

It is a vivid women's dance with quick and small steps and small jumps. The dancers are holding belts and begin their dance in the position of a half circle. The dance rhythm is 2/4.

See also
Music of North Macedonia

External links
Video of Šopka on YouTube

Macedonian dances